Ben Mastwyk is an Australian country songwriter and entertainer.

History
In 2015, Mastwyk released his debut album Mornin' Evenin''' limited to 100 vinyl copies, before it was released digitally in 2016.

In 2016 Mastwyk has form a band to record Winning Streak. The band called The Millions feature Ben Franz, Josh Duiker, Michael Hubbard and Craig Kelly.

In March 2021, Mastwyk released his third studio album, Livin' on Gold Street, which became his first to peak inside the ARIA top 50.

Discography
Studio albums
{| class="wikitable plainrowheaders" style="text-align:center;"
|-
! rowspan="2" style="width:12em;"| Title
! rowspan="2" style="width:22em;"| Details
! colspan="1"| Peak positions
|- style="font-size:smaller;"
! width="50"| AUS
|-
! scope="row"| Mornin' Evenin'| 
 Release date: 2015
 Label: Ben Mastwyk
 Formats: LP, CD
| -
|-
! scope="row"| Winning Streak (credited to Ben Mastwyk & The Millions)
| 
 Release date: 31 May 2018
 Label: Ben Mastwyk
 Formats: CD, DD, streaming
| -
|-
! scope="row"| Livin' on Gold Street| 
 Release date: 26 March 2021
 Label: Social Family Records
 Formats: CD, DD, streaming
| 49
|-
|}

Awards and nominations
Music Victoria Awards
The Music Victoria Awards, are an annual awards night celebrating Victorian music. They commenced in 2005.

! 
|-
| 2015
| Mornin', Evenin| Best Country Album
| 
|rowspan="2"|  
|-
| 2018
| Winning Streak'' (with The Millions)
| Best Country Album
| 
|-
| 2021
| Ben Mastwyk & His Millions
| Best Country Act
| 
|
|-

References

Australian country guitarists
Australian country singers
Australian male singers
Living people
Australian male guitarists
People from Victoria (Australia)
Year of birth missing (living people)